Kanagasabai Pathmanathan was a Sri Lankan Tamil politician and Member of Parliament.

Pathmanathan was one of the Tamil National Alliance's candidates in Ampara District at the 2004 parliamentary election. He was elected and entered Parliament.

Pathmanathan died on 21 May 2009 after a brief illness.

References

1948 births
2009 deaths
Members of the 13th Parliament of Sri Lanka
Sri Lankan Hindus
Sri Lankan Tamil politicians
Tamil National Alliance politicians